The National Union of Autonomous Trade Unions (UNSA) is one of the French confederations of trade unions, but they do not have the présomption irréfragable de représentativité of the General Confederation of Labour (CGT), French Democratic Confederation of Labour (CFDT), Workers' Force (CGT-FO), French Confederation of Christian Workers (CFTC) and French Confederation of Management – General Confederation of Executives (CFE-CGC).

Profile

The UNSA wishes to gather the reformist unions, founded on independence and dialogue with employers. However, the UNSA is not strongly implanted everywhere in France, and received most votes from the white-collar workers and the engineers.

The UNSA challenges the entrenched leadership of the reformist unions: the CFDT, CFTC and CFE-CGC, though the UNSA often co-operates with these unions.

Professional elections

The UNSA won 6.25% of the vote in the employee's college during the 2008 professional elections, its best result to date. It had won 4.99% in 2002.

See also

 Politics of France
 Trade unions:
 French Democratic Confederation of Labour
 French Confederation of Christian Workers
 Workers' Force
 General Confederation of Labour
 Solidaires Unitaires Démocratiques
 Mouvement des Entreprises de France

External links
Official site of the UNSA

National federations of trade unions
Trade unions in France
Trade Union Advisory Committee to the OECD
Trade unions established in 1993
National trade union centers of France